Goniographa naumanni is a moth of the family Noctuidae. It is confined to the Hissar Mountains, the western Pamirs (Shugnan Range, Chorog) and the north-eastern territories of Afghanistan (Badakhshan, Kadaghan and the Darwaz Mountains).

The wingspan is 32–37 mm.

External links
A Revision of the Palaearctic species of the Eugraphe (Hübner, 1821-1816) Generic complex. Parti. The genera Eugraphe and Goniographa (Lepidoptera, Noctuidae)

Noctuinae
Moths described in 2002